Wilhelm Konstantin Frommhold Petersen (12 June 1854 in Lihula – 3 February 1933 in Tallinn) was an Estonian entomologist, lepidopterist of Baltic-German descent.

He was the first who paid attention to the importance of the characteristics of genitalia in insect taxonomy. He was an early representative of the recognition concept of species.

Published works
 Die Lepidopteren-Fauna des arktischen Gebiets von Europa und die Eiszeit, Mag. Diss., 1881
 Reisebriefe aus Transkaukasien und Armenien, 1884
 Fauna baltica, Band I: Rhopalocera, 1890
 Über indifferente Charaktere als Artmerkmale. Zur Frage der geschlechtlichen Zuchtwahl 
 Eesti päevaliblikad. Systematische Bearbeitung der Tagfalter Estlands, 1927
 Lepidopteren-Fauna von Estland, 2 Bände, 1924
 Die Blattminierer-Gattungen Lithocolletis und Nepticula, 2 Bände, 1927-1929

References

1854 births
1933 deaths
People from Lääneranna Parish
People from the Governorate of Estonia
Baltic-German people
Estonian zoologists
Lepidopterists
19th-century Estonian people
20th-century Estonian scientists